Code page 708 (also known as CP 708, IBM 00708) is a code page used under DOS to write Arabic.

Character set
The following table shows code page 708.

References

708